Jerzy Chromik  (15 June 1931 in Mysłowice – 20 October 1987 in Katowice) was a foremost long-distance runner from Poland.

Biography
Chromik took eight national titles at long distances: 3000 m steeplechase (1952, 1954, 1956, 1960, 1961, 1962), 5000 m (1953), 10,000 m (1955).

He participated in three European Championships in Athletics in Bern (1954), Stockholm (1958), Belgrade (1962). He also took place in the 1956 Summer Olympics in Melbourne (1956), and the 17th Olympic Games in Rome (1960).

In 1955, Chromik won the 5.000 metres, ahead of Sándor Iharos, József Kovács, Emil Zátopek, and Zdzisław Krzyszkowiak, at the International Youth Festival in Warsaw. In 1955 and 1958, he won the 3000m in the Kusocinski Memorial in Warsaw. In the 1958 European Championship at Stockholm, he won gold medal at the 3000m steeplechase. In 1959, he won a Cross L'Humanité in Paris.

Chromik set the 3000m steeplechase world records with 8:41.2 in Brno (August 1955), 8:40.2 in Budapest (September 1955), and 8:32.0 in Warsaw (August 1958).

References

1931 births
1987 deaths
People from Mysłowice
People from Silesian Voivodeship (1920–1939)
Polish male long-distance runners
Polish male steeplechase runners
Athletes (track and field) at the 1956 Summer Olympics
Athletes (track and field) at the 1960 Summer Olympics
Olympic athletes of Poland
World record setters in athletics (track and field)
European Athletics Championships medalists
Sportspeople from Silesian Voivodeship